Vladan "Vlado" Čapljić (Serbian Cyrillic: Владан Владо Чапљић; born 22 March 1962) is a Bosnian professional football manager and former player.

Playing career

Club
Čapljić started playing in the youth teams of hometown club Željezničar where he played until 1985. With them, he reached the semi-finals of the 1984–85 UEFA Cup.

Next, Čapljić moved to Belgrade to play with Partizan where he won two national championships, in 1986 and 1987. In January 1988, he moved to Dinamo Zagreb where he played until 1990.

Čapljić then returned briefly to Željezničar, before, in 1992, deciding to move abroad, to Portugal, where he played for lower league club Esposende, before hanging up his boots in 1994.

International
Čapljić played for all the youth selections, before making his senior debut for Yugoslavia in a March 1984 friendly match against Hungary and has earned a total of 4 caps, scoring no goals. He also played for the olympic team at the 1984 Summer Olympics and won a bronze medal.

His final international was a September 1985 FIFA World Cup qualification match against East Germany.

Managerial career
After having retired, Čapljić decided to stay attached to football, and, after getting the coaching diploma, he started managing a number of teams in Serbia. He was also a manager of a few teams in Bosnia and Herzegovina. Čapljić was the manager of Radnički Obrenovac, Bežanija, Srem Jakovo, Timočanin, Radnički Kragujevac, Slavija Sarajevo, Rudar Prijedor, Donji Srem, Mačva Šabac, his former club Željezničar and Vršac.

Čapljić was most recently the manager for a third time in his career of Serbian First League club Radnički Kragujevac in 2017.

Honours
Partizan 
Yugoslav First League: 1985–86, 1986–87
Yugoslavia
Summer Olympics Third place: 1984

References

External links

1962 births
Living people
Footballers from Sarajevo
Serbs of Bosnia and Herzegovina
Association football central defenders
Yugoslav footballers
Yugoslavia under-21 international footballers
Yugoslavia international footballers
Olympic footballers of Yugoslavia
Olympic bronze medalists for Yugoslavia
Footballers at the 1984 Summer Olympics
Medalists at the 1984 Summer Olympics
Olympic medalists in football
Bosnia and Herzegovina footballers
FK Željezničar Sarajevo players
FK Partizan players
GNK Dinamo Zagreb players
A.D. Esposende players
Yugoslav First League players
Segunda Divisão players
Bosnia and Herzegovina expatriate footballers
Expatriate footballers in Portugal
Bosnia and Herzegovina expatriate sportspeople in Portugal
Bosnia and Herzegovina football managers
FK Bežanija managers
FK Radnički 1923 managers
FK Slavija Sarajevo managers
FK Rudar Prijedor managers
FK Donji Srem managers
FK Mačva Šabac managers
FK Željezničar Sarajevo managers
Premier League of Bosnia and Herzegovina managers
Serbian SuperLiga managers
Bosnia and Herzegovina expatriate football managers
Expatriate football managers in Serbia
Bosnia and Herzegovina expatriate sportspeople in Serbia
FK Partizan non-playing staff